The Zambia national football team represents Zambia in men's international association football and it is governed by the Football Association of Zambia (FAZ). During the 1980s, they were known as the KK 11, after founding president Dr. Kenneth Kaunda ("KK") who ruled Zambia from 1964 to 1991. After the country adopted multiparty politics, the side was nicknamed Chipolopolo, the "Copper Bullets". The team has three Africa Cup of Nations final appearances to its credit, winning the 2012 tournament with victory over Ivory Coast in the final. The team has never qualified for the FIFA World Cup.

History

Early years (1929–1970)

Zambia's first official match, following their acceptance into FIFA, was played on July 3, 1964, at home against Tanzania, which ended with a victory for the Chipolopolos 1–0. "Chipolopolos" is the nickname of the Zambian team, which means "Copper Bullets" due to the abundance of copper in Zambia. During the match, Zambia was not yet independent as Zambian independence from the United Kingdom occurred on the October 24, 1964. On November 22, 1969, Zambia suffered one of the two biggest defeats in its history against DR Congo 10–1. Since the 1970 World Cup qualifiers, Zambia has failed to qualify for a World Cup finals tournament.

African Cup of Nations 1974

After two previous attempts to participate in the African Cup of Nations, the Zambia national football team succeeded in qualifying for the first time in 1974. In the first round, they beat Côte d'Ivoire (1–0, goal from Simon Kaushi), lost against Egypt (1-3, goal from Godfrey Chitalu) and beat Uganda (1–0, goal from Obby Kapita), finishing second in the group and qualified for the semi-finals, where they beat Congo (4–2, a Bernard Chanda hat-trick and Joseph Mapulanga's goal). In the final, Zaire and Zambia drew 2-2 (goals from Simon Kaushi and Brighton Sinyangwe) and had to have a replay for the title but, two days after the first match, Zambia lost 2-0 and saw their title aspirations disappear. However this was viewed with great pride considering it was their first participation in the tournament.

1974–1993

After their appearance in the final in 1974, the Zambian football team failed to qualify for the following tournament in 1976. In 1978, Zambia was eliminated in the first round with a single victory (2–0 against Burkina Faso, goals from Patrick Phiri and Bizwell Phiri), a draw (0–0 against Nigeria) and a defeat (1–2 against Ghana, goal from Obby Kapita). In 1980, they failed to qualify; but in 1982 they again reached the semi-finals and took third place, beating Algeria, having lost to Libya in the semis. In 1984, Zambia did not qualify; in 1986, they reached the first round with a point collected against Algeria (0–0). In 1988, they did not qualify. In 1990, after finishing first in the group, Zambia lost in the semi-finals against Nigeria, but beat Senegal (1–0, goal from Webster Chikabala) to collect third place. In 1992, Zambia was beaten in the quarters by Côte d'Ivoire (0-1). This period shows that Zambia is a good footballing power but it shows irregularity in a few first rounds and non-qualifiers.

Zambian Air Force Flight 319

Tragedy struck the Zambian team when the military plane (REG: AF-319) transporting the team to Senegal for a 1994 FIFA World Cup qualifier crashed late in the evening, on April 27, 1993. Three stops were planned for re-fuelling, but at the first stop, in Brazzaville, engine problems were noted on the Buffalo DHC-5D of the Zambia Air Force. Despite this, the flight continued and a few minutes after take-off from Libreville, Gabon, where the second stopover had taken place, one of the engines caught fire and stopped. The pilot, who had already made a flight from Mauritius the day before, accidentally shut down the engine, which was still running. The loss of power, during the climb after take-off, caused the plane to fall and crash into the water 500m off the coast. All 30 passengers and crew, including 18 players, were killed in the accident.

Team captain and coach Kalusha Bwalya was not on board. Held in the Netherlands for a match with his club, PSV Eindhoven, he was to join Senegal separately for the qualifying match. A new team was quickly created, coached by Kalusha: he had the difficult task of leading Zambia through qualification for the FIFA World Cup and then preparing for the qualifications for the next Africa Cup of Nations. It was probably an impossible mission and Zambia did not qualify for the World Cup.

African Cup of Nations 1994

In 1994, after a draw against Sierra Leone (0–0), Zambia beat Côte d'Ivoire (1–0, goal from Kenneth Malitoli) and finished first in the group. In the quarterfinals, they beat Senegal (1–0, goal from Evans Sakala), then in the semi-finals, Zambia beat Mali (4–0, goals from Elijah Litana, Zeddy Saileti, Kalusha Bwalya and Kenneth Malitoli). In the final, in Tunis, they faced Nigeria and despite the opening goal of Elijah Litana in the 3rd minute, Nigeria won 2–1.

1994–2012

On June 3, 1994, in Brussels, the Zambian football team succumbed to one of its worst losses in its history against Belgium, losing 9–0. At CAN 1996, they finished first in the group with two victories (5–1 against Burkina Faso, goals from Kenneth Malitoli, double from Kalusha Bwalya, goals from Dennis Lota and Johnson Bwalya); 4–0 against Sierra Leone (a hattrick from Kalusha Bwalya and goal from Mordon Malitoli) and a draw (0–0 against Algeria), beat Egypt (3–1) in the quarterfinals and loses in semis against Tunisia (2–4) but took third place over Ghana (1–0, goal from Johnson Bwalya). Kalusha Bwalya was the best in the competition with 5 goals. From 1998 to 2006, Zambia did not pass the first round, except in 2004 when they failed to qualify. On September 3, 2006, at home, Zambia achieved the biggest victory in its history against Djibouti, winning 10–0. During the 2008 Africa Cup of Nations, Zambia finished third in the group with a 3–0 victory against Sudan (goals by James Chamanga, Jacob Mulenga and Felix Katongo), a draw (1–1 against Egypt, goal from Chris Katongo) and loss (1–5 against Cameroon, goal from Chris Katongo). In 2010, Zambia finished first in her group and faced Nigeria in the quarter-finals where she lost on penalties. Jacob Mulenga and Emmanuel Mbola were included in the tournament's Best XI.

COSAFA Cup 
The Zambia national football team has participated in the COSAFA Cup in all its editions, and has won it a joint record six times in (1997, 1998, 2006, 2013, 2019 and 2022) and a six-time losing finalist in 2004, 2005, 2007, 2009, 2017 and 2018. In 2005, Collins Mbesuma was the competition's top scorer with 4 goals.

African Cup of Nations 2012
The football team Zambia finished 1st in their group as they beat Senegal (1-2, goals from Emmanuel Mayuka and Rainford Kalaba) then they shared the points with Libya (2-2, goals from Mayuka and Christopher Katongo) and finally they beat Equatorial Guinea (0-1, goal from C. Katongo). In the quarter-finals, Zambia eliminated Sudan (3-0, goals from Stoppila Sunzu, C. Katongo and James Chamanga). In the semi-finals, Zambia eliminated Ghana 1–0, Emmanuel Mayuka scoring the only goal of the game. In the final, Zambia held Côte d'Ivoire in check (0–0) and won on penalties (8–7) Watch  

At the end of this 28th edition of the African Cup, captain Chris Katongo finished best player in competition as well as joint-top scorer with Emmanuel Mayuka for Zambia.

2013–present

In 2013, Zambia was eliminated in the first round of CAN 2013 without losing a single match (three draws). Two years later, after complicated qualifiers, Zambia qualifies once again for AFCON but is again eliminated in the first round. Zambia failed to reach the finals for the first time in 13 years for the 2017 competition and losing out to Guinea-Bissau. For CAN 2019 qualification, the Chipolopolos again failed to progress, finishing last with 7 points, one point less than Namibia, in 2nd, and two points fewer than Guinea-Bissau who finished top of the group. It is a huge disappointment for Zambia which misses a 2nd consecutive CAN even though it had won the competition 7 years earlier and was seeded at the time of the draw. The qualifying for the CAN 2022 were also difficult for Zambia, finishing 3rd and a point off of Zimbabwe who occupied the final qualification spot.

Kit provider

Recent schedule and results
The following is a list of match results from the previous 12 months, as well as any future matches that have been scheduled.

2022

2023

Managers

Caretaker managers are listed in italics.

 Ted Virba (1978)
 Brian Tiler (1978–80)
 Ted Dumitru (1980–81)
 Ante Bušelić (1981–82)
 Bill McGarry (1982–83)
 Wieslaw Grabowski (1983–84)
 Jeff Butler (1984)
 Roy Mulenga (1984)
 Brightwell Banda (1984–86)
 Samuel Ndhlovu (1987–92)
 Moses Simwala (1993)
 Godfrey Chitalu (1993)
 Roald Poulsen (1993–94)
 Ian Porterfield (1994)
 Roald Poulsen (1994–96)
 Freddie Mwila (1996–97)
 George Mungwa (1997)
 Burkhard Ziese (1997–98)
 George Mungwa (1998)
 Obby Kapita (1998)
 Fighton Simukonda (1998)
 Ben Bamfuchile (1999–00)
 George Mungwa (2000)
 Jan Brouwer (2000-01)
 Roald Poulsen (2002)
 Patrick Phiri (2002–03)
 Kalusha Bwalya (2003–06)
 Patrick Phiri (2006–08)
 Hervé Renard (2008–10)
 Wedson Nyirenda &  Honour Janza (2010)
 George Lwandamina (2010)
 Dario Bonetti (2010–11)
 Hervé Renard (2011–2013)
 Patrice Beaumelle (2013–2014)
 Honour Janza (2014–2015)
 George Lwandamina (2015–2016)
 Wedson Nyirenda (2016–2018)
 Beston Chambeshi (2018)
 Sven Vandenbroeck (2018–2019)
 Aggrey Chiyangi (2019–2020)
 Milutin Sredojević  (2020–2021)
 Beston Chambeshi  (2021–2022)
 Aljosa Asanovic (2022)
 Moses Sichone (2022)
 Avram Grant (2022–present)

Players

Current squad
The following players were called up for the friendly matches against Mali on 23 and 27 September 2022.

Caps and goals correct as of 17 July 2022, after the match against Namibia.

Recent call-ups
The following players have been called up for Zambia in the last 12 months.

Notes
DEC Player refused to join the team after the call-up.
INJ Player withdrew from the squad due to an injury.
PRE Preliminary Squad.
RET Player has retired from international football.
SUS Suspended from the national team.

Records

Players in bold are still active with Zambia.

Most appearances

Top goalscorers

Competitive record

FIFA World Cup record
When the former British colony of Northern Rhodesia, Zambia did not participate in World Cup qualification play until after its independence in 1964. The country's football association was formed in 1929 and joined FIFA in 1964.

Africa Cup of Nations record

Gossage Cup / CECAFA Cup

COSAFA Cup

Honours
 Africa Cup of Nations
Champions:  2012
 Runners-up:  1974,  1994
COSAFA Cup
 Champions: 1997, 1998, 2006, 2013, 2019, 2022
 Runners-up: 2004, 2005, 2007, 2009, 2017, 2018
CECAFA Cup
 Champions: 1984, 1991
 Runners-up: 1976, 1977, 1978, 1988, 2006

References

External links

Zambian Sports & Football Website
Zambia National Football official
Zambia at FIFA.com
ZambianFootball.net

 
African national association football teams
Football in Zambia
Z